WTOT (980 AM) is an American commercial radio station licensed by the FCC to serve the community of Marianna, Florida. As of January 2009, WTOT is owned by MFR, Inc.

According to a string of FCC filings (many of which were dismissed - see the FCC link below), this station has been silent or operating at reduced power since 2006, due to burned out tubes, and being unable to replace the transmitter until they receive proceeds from a lawsuit. The most recent request to extend the operations at reduced power has not been approved by the FCC.

In August 2008, Ed Cearley III - the general manager, president and part owner of the station - was found dead in his home, having died from natural causes, according to police.

On May 1, 2015 (after being silent for four months), WTOT returned to the air with an urban contemporary format.

On January 15, 2016, WTOT went silent. On January 2, 2017, WTOT returned to the air simulcasting oldies-formatted WTOT-FM 101.7 Graceville.

On February 7, 2017, their single tower collapsed due to high winds. They were expected to return to the air within two weeks.

On March 12, 2017, WTOT returned to the air with oldies.

On June 11, 2020, WTOT changed their call letters to WTID; the call sign change was undone on August 5, 2020.

References

External links

TOT (AM)
1958 establishments in Florida
Radio stations established in 1958
Oldies radio stations in the United States